The 1974 Ukrainian Cup was the 22nd edition of the Ukrainian SSR football knockout competition, known as the Ukrainian Cup. The competition started on May 24, and its final took place on November 16, 1974. 

The last year cup holder FC Zirka Kirovohrad was defeated in the first round by SC Lutsk.

This year involved participation of three teams out of the Soviet First League as well. They entered the competition at quarterfinals.

Teams

Tournament distribution
The competition was conducted among all 18 Ukrainian clubs of the 1974 Soviet Second League, Zone 6 and all 3 Ukrainian clubs of the 1974 Soviet First League.

Other professional teams
The six Ukrainian professional teams in the Soviet Top League did not take part in the competition.
 1974 Soviet Top League (6): FC Chornomorets Odesa, FC Dnipro Dnipropetrovsk, FC Dynamo Kyiv, FC Karpaty Lviv, FC Shakhtar Donetsk, FC Zorya Voroshylovhrad

Competition schedule

First round (1/16)
The first legs were played on 24 May, and the second legs were played on 12 June 1974.

|}

Second round
The first legs were played on 20 July, and the second legs were played on 21 August 1974.

|}

Quarterfinals
The first legs were played on 23 September, and the second legs were played on 14 October 1974. Also, three clubs of the Soviet First League entered the competition FC Spartak Ivano-Frankivsk, SC Tavriya Simferopol, FC Metalurh Zaporizhia.

|}

Semifinals
The first legs were played on 4 November, and the second legs were played on 10 November 1974.

|}

Final

The first leg was played on 12 November, and the second leg was played on 16 November 1974.

|}

First leg

Second leg

Tavriya won 4–1 on aggregate

References

External links
 1974 Cup of the Ukrainian SSR
 Cup holders of the Ukrainian SSR

Football Cup of the Ukrainian SSR
1974 in Ukrainian football
1974 domestic association football cups